Akokan may refer to:
Akokan, Niger, a mining town in Niger
 Akokan (album), an album by Roberto Fonseca
A misspelling for Akukan mine, an abandoned Russian mining and Gulag labor camp site